Rujm Al-Malfouf is one of a series of watchtowers from the Ammonite kingdom in modern day Amman, Jordan. Its name can be directly translated as the Hill of the Twisted [Stone], which derives from the tower's circular shape. Built in the first half of the first millennium BC, the watchtower is located on Jabal Amman. Rujm Al-Malfouf is next to the Jordanian Ministry of Antiquities.

See also
Ammon
Jabal Amman
Jabal al-Qal'a
Rujm

References

External links
Rujm al-Malfouf

Buildings and structures in Amman
Archaeological sites in Jordan
Buildings and structures completed in the 1st millennium BC